Qualification for the 1995 FIBA European Championship, commonly called FIBA EuroBasket 1995 took place between 21 June 1993 and 4 June 1995. A total of twelve teams qualified for the tournament, joining hosts Greece and European Champions Germany.

Format
A total of 34 teams participated. Competition consisted of three stages:

A Qualifying Round that consisted of nineteen teams divided in three round robin tournament that took place in Wien-Austria, Zalaegerszeg-Hungary and Prievidza-Slovak Republic between 21 Jun and 27 Jun 1993.
A Semi-Final Round where the first and second teams from each of the three groups from the Qualifying Round joined another fourteen teams. All twenty teams where then divided in five round robin groups of four teams each. This stage took place between 10 November 1993 and 16 November 1994 and competition consisted of home and away legs, taking place in each of the participating countries. The top two teams from each group qualified for EuroBasket 1995.
An Additional Qualifying Round where the best four third-placed teams from the Semi-Final Round joined FR Yugoslavia, which was banned during the last edition, in a round robin tournament that took place in Sofia-Bulgaria between 31 May and 4 Jun 1995. The top two teams qualified for EuroBasket 1995.

Qualifying round

Group A (Wien, Austria)

|}

Group B (Zalaegerszeg , Hungary)

|}
Rules=1) Points; 2) Head-to-head results; 3) Points difference; 4) Points scored.

Group C (Prievidza , Slovak Republic)

|}

Semi-final round

Group A

|}
Rules=1) Points; 2) Head-to-head results; 3) Points difference; 4) Points scored.

Group B

|}
Rules=1) Points; 2) Head-to-head results; 3) Points difference; 4) Points scored.

Group C

|}

Ukraine didn’t play this game and Russia received a forfait (20-0)

Group D

|}
Rules=1) Points; 2) Head-to-head results; 3) Points difference; 4) Points scored.

Group E

|}

Additional qualifying round

Group X (Sofia, Bulgaria)

|}
Rules=1) Points; 2) Head-to-head results; 3) Points difference; 4) Points scored.

Bosnia-Herzegovina didn’t play this game and Yugoslavia received a forfait (0-20)

References

External links

qualification
1993–94 in European basketball
1994–95 in European basketball
1995–96 in European basketball
1995